Oncotympanini is a tribe of cicadas in the family Cicadidae, found in China and southeast Asia. There are at least 3 genera and about 12 described species in Oncotympanini.

Genera
These three genera belong to the tribe Oncotympanini:
 Mata Distant, 1906 c g
 Neoncotympana Lee, 2010 c g
 Oncotympana Stål, 1870 c g
Data sources: i = ITIS, c = Catalogue of Life, g = GBIF, b = Bugguide.net

References

Further reading

 
 
 
 
 
 
 
 
 
 
 

 
Cicadinae
Hemiptera tribes